Marquess of Tweeddale (sometimes spelled Tweedale) is a title of the Peerage of Scotland, created in 1694 for the 2nd Earl of Tweeddale. Lord Tweeddale holds the subsidiary titles of Earl of Tweeddale (created 1646), Earl of Gifford (1694), Viscount of Walden (1694), Lord Hay of Yester (1488), and Baron Tweeddale, of Yester in the County of Haddington (1881), all but the last in the Peerage of Scotland.  As Baron Tweeddale in the Peerage of the United Kingdom, Lord Tweeddale sat between 1881 and 1963 in the House of Lords. The Marquess's eldest son uses Viscount Walden as a courtesy title.

Lord Tweeddale also holds the title of Hereditary Chamberlain of Dunfermline.

The family seat was Yester House, near Gifford, East Lothian.

Lords Hay of Yester (1488)
John Hay, 1st Lord Hay of Yester (c. 1450–1508)
John Hay, 2nd Lord Hay of Yester (k. Battle of Flodden 1513)
John Hay, 3rd Lord Hay of Yester (d. 1543)
John Hay, 4th Lord Hay of Yester (d. 1557)
William Hay, 5th Lord Hay of Yester (d. 1586)
William Hay, 6th Lord Hay of Yester (d. 1591)
James Hay, 7th Lord Hay of Yester (d. 1609)
John Hay, 8th Lord Hay of Yester (1593–1653) (created Earl of Tweeddale in 1646)

Earls of Tweeddale (1646)
John Hay, 1st Earl of Tweeddale (1593–1653)
John Hay, 2nd Earl of Tweeddale (1626–1697) (created Marquess of Tweeddale in 1694)

Marquesses of Tweeddale (1694)
John Hay, 1st Marquess of Tweeddale, 2nd Earl of Tweeddale, 1st Earl of Gifford, 1st Viscount Walden (1626–1697)
John Hay, 2nd Marquess of Tweeddale, 3rd Earl of Tweeddale, 2nd Earl of Gifford, 2nd Viscount Walden (1645–1713)
Charles Hay, 3rd Marquess of Tweeddale, 4th Earl of Tweeddale, 3rd Earl of Gifford, 3rd Viscount Walden (1670–1715)
John Hay, 4th Marquess of Tweeddale, 5th Earl of Tweeddale, 4th Earl of Gifford, 4th Viscount Walden (1695–1762)
George Hay, 5th Marquess of Tweeddale, 6th Earl of Tweeddale, 5th Earl of Gifford, 5th Viscount Walden (1758–1770)
George Hay, 6th Marquess of Tweeddale, 7th Earl of Tweeddale, 6th Earl of Gifford, 6th Viscount Walden (1700–1787)
George Hay, 7th Marquess of Tweeddale, 8th Earl of Tweeddale, 7th Earl of Gifford, 7th Viscount Walden (1753–1804)
George Hay, 8th Marquess of Tweeddale, 9th Earl of Tweeddale, 8th Earl of Gifford, 8th Viscount Walden (1787–1876)
Arthur Hay, 9th Marquess of Tweeddale, 10th Earl of Tweeddale, 9th Earl of Gifford, 9th Viscount Walden (1824–1878)
William Montagu Hay, 10th Marquess of Tweeddale, 11th Earl of Tweeddale, 10th Earl of Gifford, 10th Viscount Walden, 1st Baron Tweeddale (1826–1911)
William George Montagu Hay, 11th Marquess of Tweeddale, 12th Earl of Tweeddale, 11th Earl of Gifford, 11th Viscount Walden, 2nd Baron Tweeddale  (1884–1967)
David George Montagu Hay, 12th Marquess of Tweeddale, 13th Earl of Tweeddale, 12th Earl of Gifford, 12th Viscount Walden, 3rd Baron Tweeddale (1921–1979)
Edward Douglas John Hay, 13th Marquess of Tweeddale, 14th Earl of Tweeddale, 13th Earl of Gifford, 13th Viscount Walden, 4th Baron Tweeddale (1947–2005)
Charles David Montagu Hay, 14th Marquess of Tweeddale, 15th Earl of Tweeddale, 14th Earl of Gifford, 14th Viscount Walden, 5th Baron Tweeddale (b. 1947)

Present peer
Charles David Montagu Hay, 14th Marquess of Tweeddale (born 6 August 1947) is the son of the 12th Marquess and his wife Sonia Mary Peake, daughter of Osbert Peake, 1st Viscount Ingleby and Lady Joan Rachel de Vere Capell. He was educated at Milton Abbey School and Trinity College, Oxford. In 2003 he was living at 336a Gilmerton Road, Edinburgh. On 1 February 2005 he succeeded as Marquess of Tweeddale (1694), Earl of Tweeddale (1646), Baron Tweeddale of Yester (1881), Earl of Gifford (1694), Viscount of Walden (1694), and Lord Hay of Yester (1488).

The heir presumptive is the present holder's brother Lord Alistair Hay (b. 1955), whose heir presumptive is his half-brother Lord Andrew Arthur George Hay (b. 1959), whose heir apparent is his son Angus David George Hay (b. 1991).

Coat of Arms

Family Tree

See also
Clan Hay
Yester House

References

Further reading
 .  Online at electricscotland.com.
 .  (Online at Exact Editions and Credo Reference. Subscription or library card required.)

External links

 
Marquessates in the Peerage of Scotland
Clan Hay
1694 establishments in Scotland
Noble titles created in 1694